F120 may refer to :

 Farman F.120, a 1920 family of multi-engine airliners and bombers 
 General Electric YF120, a 1980s advanced aircraft engine